S-Nitrosotriphenylmethanethiol is the organosulfur compound with the formula (C6H5)3CSNO.  It is a rare example of a nitrosothiol derivative that is robust solid at room temperature.  The green compound can be produced by the reaction of triphenylmethanethiol with nitrous acid:
(C6H5)3CSH  +  HONO  →  (C6H5)3CSNO  +  H2O

According to X-ray crystallography, S-nitrosotriphenylmethanethiol features a conventional trityl group appended to a bent SNO substituent.  The S-N=O angle is 114°, while the S-N and N=O distances are 1.78 and 1.79 Å.  Other S-nitrosothiols, e.g. MeSNO and SNAP have characterized by similar structures.

References

Nitroso compounds
Sulfur compounds